Henri Ménessier (1 October 1882 – 1948) was a French artist and art director.

Selected filmography
 The Virtuous Model (1919)
 The Orchid Dancer (1928)
 The Pure Truth (1931)
 Monsieur Albert (1932)
 Dora Nelson (1935)
 Lucrezia Borgia (1935)
 The Assault (1936)
 You Can't Fool Antoinette (1936)
 Gargousse (1938)
 Night in December (1940)

References

Bibliography
 Michael L. Stephens. Art Directors in Cinema: A Worldwide Biographical Dictionary. McFarland, 1998.

External links

1882 births
1948 deaths
French art directors